Franz Lehár is a 1923 Austrian silent biographical film directed by Wilhelm Thiele and Hans Torre. It portrays the life of the composer Franz Lehár. Lehár was supportive of the film and wrote a score to accompany it based on his own operettas.

References

Bibliography

External links

1923 films
1920s biographical films
Austrian biographical films
Austrian silent feature films
Films directed by Wilhelm Thiele
Films about classical music and musicians
Films about composers
Austrian black-and-white films